Ahsham-e Manu Ahmadi (also Romanized as Aḩsham-e Manū Aḩmadī and Aḩshām-e Manū Aḩmadī) is a village in Abkosh Rural District, Bord Khun District, Deyr County, Bushehr Province, Iran. At the 2006 census, its population was 206, in 35 families.

References 

Populated places in Deyr County